The Stem Tetrapoda are a cladistically defined group, consisting of all animals more closely related to extant four-legged vertebrates than to their closest extant relatives (the lungfish), but excluding the crown group Tetrapoda. They are thus paraphyletic, though acceptable in phylogenetic nomenclature as the group is defined by strict reference to phylogeny rather than to traits as in traditional systematics. Thus, some finned sarcopterygians are considered to be stem tetrapods.

Content of the group

Stem tetrapods are members of Tetrapodomorpha, the total group and clade that also includes their descendants, the crown tetrapods:

The stem Tetrapoda encompass three distinct grades successively closer to crown group Tetrapoda:

 Osteolepiformes, a group of lobe-finned fishes that includes the families Canowindridae, Tristichopteridae, Megalichthyidae, and Osteolepidae
 Elpistostegalia, the more advanced lobe-finned fishes (Tristichopteridae) and the "fishapods" (genera such as Panderichthys and Tiktaalik)
 Ichthyostegalia, the primarily aquatic primitive labyrinthodonts such as Acanthostega, Ichthyostega, Tulerpeton, and probably loxommatids.

Both Ichthyostegalia and Labyrinthodontia constitute paraphyletic evolutionary grades rather than clades, with amniotes and modern amphibians branching off at some point from the latter. The stem tetrapods may also include one or both of Temnospondyli and Lepospondyli, depending on author. This is due to the uncertain origin of the modern amphibians, whose position in the phylogenetic tree dictates what lineages go in the crown group Tetrapoda. Neither is there for the moment a consensus of the phylogeny of stem tetrapods, nor how Tetrapoda itself should be defined (i.e. as a crown group, or as an apomorphy-based group, using the limb with digits), making the actual content of the group uncertain.

References

 
Tetrapod taxonomy
Paraphyletic groups